BankCard Services is an American credit card processor. It was founded in 1987 and is headquartered in Torrance, California, with 12 branch offices across the US and alliance partners in 22 states. BankCard Services is the world's 139st largest acquirer for merchant card processing based on volume of all purchase transaction (Visa, MasterCard, Union Pay, American Express, Discover, Diners Club, JCB, domestic debit and domestic credit) by country.

BankCard Services’ service mark, NAVYZ, provides point of sale (POS) systems, website builders, marketing and loyalty programs and financial loans for small businesses.

History 
The company was founded in 1987 in Los Angeles, California. In 2014 its service mark NAVYZ was established.

References

Credit cards